The Goldbach is a river of Saxony, Germany. It is a left tributary of the Münzbach, which it joins in Freiberg.

See also
List of rivers of Saxony

Rivers of Saxony
Freiberg
Rivers of Germany